Leith Walk is one of the seventeen wards used to elect members of the City of Edinburgh Council. Established in 2007 along with the other wards, it currently elects four councillors. Its territory spans the area between Edinburgh city centre and the port of Leith to its north-east, centred around Leith Walk, the primary thoroughfare between them.

Northern parts of the ward fall within the historic burgh of Leith, but other neighbourhoods such as Broughton, Powderhall, Hillside and Canonmills (divided between Leith Walk and Inverleith wards) were always part of Edinburgh. Bonnington and Pilrig are on the boundary between the two burghs but entirely within Leith Walk ward, which in 2019 had a population of 34,651.

Councillors

Election Results

2022 Election
2022 City of Edinburgh Council election

2017 Election
2017 City of Edinburgh Council election

On 20 February 2018, SNP Cllr. Lewis Ritchie resigned from the party and became an Independent, following complaints about his behaviour arising out of allegedly punching someone in a taxi.

2019 by-election
On 28 January 2019, Labour councillor Marion Donaldson announced she was resigning from the Council citing reports of internal party tensions. A by-election was held on 11 April 2019 and was won by Robb Munn of the SNP.

2012 Election
2012 City of Edinburgh Council election

2015 by-election
SNP councillor Deidre Brock was elected as an MP for Edinburgh North and Leith (UK Parliament constituency) on 7 May 2015 and resigned her Council seat on 24 June 2015. Green Councillor Maggie Chapman resigned her seat on 30 June 2015 to focus her efforts on winning a Scottish Parliament seat in North East Scotland. A by-election for both seats was held on 10 September 2015, Lewis Ritchie defending the SNP seat and Labour's Marion Donaldson taking the other.

2007 Election
2007 City of Edinburgh Council election

References

External links
Listed Buildings in Leith Walk Ward, City of Edinburgh at British Listed Buildings

Wards of Edinburgh
Leith